In Pakistan, Islamic culture is predominant, but Pakistan also has its own cultural etiquette based mainly on South Asian influence.

Introduction and greeting
Combined-family system is usually [referred but in modern times, the unit-family system prevails more than the former. Elders are respected to the utmost and get love and honour from youngsters, even if they are strangers and meeting each other for the first time in any situation.
Guests are honoured delightfully and treated highly with respect so, relatives, colleagues, friends and people in neighbourhood feel happy and cheerful to meet and stay connected with each other. Usually, in educated families, guests inform the host before their arrival so that someone's routine is not disturbed.
Relatives, co-workers, neighbours, friends and mates stay united in every joy and sorrow and compete with each other in helping their friend in problem.
 In formal contexts, it was previously considered rude to introduce yourself to strangers, and therefore generally advisable to ask some mutual acquaintance to introduce you. Strangers will speak with each other in the "formal" register of Urdu, and using the familiar register will be seen as very rude. This is not the case in everyday life.
 People of the opposite sex do not usually shake hands or interact at all, although this rule is more relaxed if one of the participants is an elder or a close relative.
 The Province of the Punjab is more liberal, whereas the KPK and Balochistan are a bit conservative and prefer to keep up with traditions wholeheartedly. The literacy rate is higher in the Punjab than the other provinces in Pakistan.
In urban Sindh and in other parts of the country, men and women usually lower their head and lift their hand to their forehead to make the "adab" gesture when greeting each other.
 When being introduced to elders or strangers while seated it is customary to get up as sign of respect.
 It is advisable to ask a person how they wish to be addressed.
·Pakistani people are generally very affectionate towards children. It is considered rude and disrespectful to not interact with children, no matter their age.
·Pakistani people generally speak in a very roundabout way, often using many similes, metaphors, and it is fairly common for passages from poems to be recited or cites during conversions.
·It is inadvisable to bring alcohol as a gift to any Pakistani home (As Islam is the dominant religion in the country and it prohibits any mind-altering substances).
·Avoid discussing subjects such as sex and intimacy as these are considered to be taboo.
·Most Pakistani people are not accepting of homosexuality. In many cases they are unaware of the concept.
·Casual dating is considered extremely inappropriate. Moreover, people of the opposite gender seen together in public are subject to judgement. Dating is thought to bring shame and dishonor to the family.
·However in recent years dating has become less of a taboo in Pakistan. This is largely due to the increasing influence of Western culture.
·Arranged marriages are a common practice in Pakistan. Suitable spouses are chosen by the elders of the family by taking into consideration the other family's financial and social standing.

Etiquette in a business environment 
 English is widely spoken and understood in major cities. The local dialect is called Pakistani English.
 If at all possible, try not to schedule meetings during Ramadan. The workday is shortened, and since Muslims fast, they will not be able to offer you tea, which is a sign of hospitality.
 Meetings are not scheduled at prayer time.

See also

 Pakistan
 Pakistani culture

Further reading

References

Pakistan
Pakistan, Etiquette
Pakistani culture